Oklahoma Wesleyan University (OKWU) is a private university of the Wesleyan church in Bartlesville, Oklahoma.  In 2018, the school had 1006 undergraduate students, with approximately 600 of those on its main campus in Bartlesville.

History
Oklahoma Wesleyan University was founded by The Wesleyan Church to provide higher education within a Christian environment for Wesleyan youth. Central Pilgrim College, its predecessor, was founded on the campus in Bartlesville, Oklahoma from a series of mergers of several schools: the Colorado Bible College (Colorado Springs, Colorado), the Pilgrim Bible College (Pasadena, California), and the Holiness Evangelistic Institute (El Monte, California). Central Pilgrim College was renamed Bartlesville Wesleyan College in 1968, following a merger of the Pilgrim Holiness Church and the Wesleyan Methodist Church to become the Wesleyan Church. In 1972, the college merged with a Kansas school, Miltonvale Wesleyan College; the resulting school became a four-year college having about 1300 students.  In August 2001, Bartlesville Wesleyan College became Oklahoma Wesleyan University (OKWU).

2015 withdrawal from Council for Christian Colleges and Universities
A longtime member of the Council for Christian Colleges and Universities (CCCU), in 2015 the university withdrew from the organization. OKWU's president cited CCCU's "reluctance to make a swift decision" in response to the decisions of two member schools (Goshen College and Eastern Mennonite University) which changed their hiring policies to include same-sex couples, as an unwillingness to defend the biblical definition of marriage.

2016 Title IX lawsuit
On August 15, 2016, OKWU joined a court challenge to a 2011 mandate from the U. S. Department of Education Office for Civil Rights requiring colleges and universities adjudicate what they called "a unconstitutional process and standard."  Former president Piper stated, in part, that they "refuse to accept any government intrusion that would require OKWU to teach the antithesis of our Christian beliefs concerning sexual behavior" and that OKWU's students "should have the legal right to avail themselves of local law enforcement without their petition being compromised by the intrusion of an OCR-mandated committee of amateurs that contravenes the due process and confidentiality of the legal process."  The suit was sponsored by the Foundation for Individual Rights in Education.

Antecedent schools
The following is a list of antecedent schools:
 Bartlesville Wesleyan College
 Miltonvale Wesleyan College
 Central Pilgrim College
 Holiness Evangelistic Institute
 Pilgrim Bible College
 Colorado Springs Bible College

Timeline
 1905 – Rocky Mountain Missionary & Evangelistic School is founded in Colorado Springs, Colorado. 
 1909 – Miltonvale Wesleyan College is founded in Miltonvale, Kansas.
 1910 – RMMES is renamed Colorado Springs Bible College.
 1917 – Pilgrim Bible College is founded in Pasadena, California.
 1932 – Holiness Evangelistic Institute is founded in El Monte, California.
 1959 – Colorado Springs Bible College, Pilgrim Bible College and Holiness Evangelistic Institute merge to become Central Pilgrim College in Bartlesville, Oklahoma.
 1968 – The Pilgrim Holiness Church and Wesleyan Methodist Church merge to become the Wesleyan Church. Central Pilgrim College becomes Bartlesville Wesleyan College.
 1972 – Miltonvale Wesleyan College and Bartlesville Wesleyan College merge and retain the Bartlesville Wesleyan College name.
 2001 – Bartlesville Wesleyan College becomes Oklahoma Wesleyan University.

Presidents
 Dr. Leo Cox (1969–1974)
 Dr. John Snook (1974–1983)
 Dr. Paul Mills (1983–2002)
 Dr. Charles Joiner (interim, 2002) 
 Dr. Everett Piper (2002–2019) 
 Dr. James A. Dunn (2019–present)

Academics
OKWU offers 54 majors through its five schools: its School of Arts & Sciences, School of Ministry & Christian Thought, School of Business, School of Education and Exercise Science, and School of Nursing.

Rankings
In 2019, it was ranked #85 in Regional Universities West, according to U.S. News & World Report.

Athletics
The Oklahoma Wesleyan (OKWU) athletic teams are called the Eagles. The university is a member of the National Association of Intercollegiate Athletics (NAIA), primarily competing in the Kansas Collegiate Athletic Conference since the 2015–16 academic year. They are also a member of the National Christian College Athletic Association (NCCAA), primarily competing as an independent in the Central Region of the Division I level. The Eagles previously competed in the defunct Midlands Collegiate Athletic Conference (MCAC) from 1994–95 to 2014–15 (when the conference dissolved).

OKWU competes in 19 intercollegiate varsity sports: Men's sports include baseball, basketball, cross country, golf, soccer, tennis, track & field and wrestling; while women's sports include basketball, beach volleyball (added in 2021–22), cross country, golf, soccer, softball, tennis, track & field and volleyball; and co-ed sports include cheerleading and eSports.

Notable alumni
 Kurt Bahr, Missouri state legislator
 David Brown, Minnesota state legislator
 Orval Butcher, minister
 Jim Garlow, minister, author, political activist
 Joshua Klumb, South Dakota state legislator
 Wilbur Nelson, minister and radio broadcaster, Morning Chapel Hour
 Jordan Tata, professional baseball player

References

External links

 
 Oklahoma Wesleyan athletics website

 
Private universities and colleges in Oklahoma
Universities and colleges affiliated with the Wesleyan Church
Bartlesville, Oklahoma
Educational institutions established in 2001
Evangelicalism in Oklahoma
2001 establishments in Oklahoma